René Luckhardt (born 1972) is a Swiss-German artist. Luckhardt holds a Master of Fine Art degree in Painting from Chelsea College of Arts, London.

Luckhardt's art often deals with positions in art history, most recently with those of Man Ray or Marjorie Cameron. His practice has been described as „ricerche“ (Peter Weiermair). Luckhardt uses the source materials for "multiple transformations". "The archaeological process is not obscured, but becomes part of the work itself by raising questions about the original and the copy." In other series the paintings are "sculpturally transformed". Undergoing a process of endless reproduction and anamorphosis, the painting sculptures appear like "totem(s) of cultural history".

Luckhardt counts Lewis Carroll and Aleister Crowley among his influences. In 2010, he reproduced the latter's Chambre des Cauchemars of the Abbey of Thelema in a gallery space. In 2010, he initiated the international artist salon Wonderloch Kellerland in Berlin, satellites of which existed in Los Angeles and Manhattan. Wonderloch Kellerland is included in the Art Spaces Directory of the New Museum, New York. Luckhardt is co-author of HER, the Hermetic Experimental Research project.

Exhibitions

Solo exhibitions
 2021 Flowers still live, Galerie Bernd Kugler, Innsbruck
 2020 Anamorphic Selfportrait, public space by Nina Mielcarczyk Baumwollspinnerei, Leipzig
 2020 Anamorphic or apparently anamorphic testpiece, Galerie Bernd Kugler, Innsbruck
 2018 Diaikone, Weißfrauenkirche, Frankfurt
 2017 Anamorphic Portraits, Galerie Bernd Kugler, Innsbruck
 2015 MANufactoRAY, Galerie Bernd Kugler, Innsbruck
 2013 abc – art berlin contemporary, Berlin
 2013 René Luckhardt's Kellerloch Paintings, Autocenter, Berlin
 2012 René Luckhardt's Clown Cube, Bourouina Gallery, Berlin
 2011 Keller Kolored Kandy Klowns, Wonderloch Kellerland, Los Angeles
 2011 The Grandmother in Contemporary Art, Galerie Seiler, Munich

Group exhibitions
 2019 Auf der Kippe. Eine Konfliktgeschichte des Tabaks, Tiroler Volkskunstmuseum, Innsbruck
 2018 You are just a piece of action. Portraits from the Miettinen Collection, Salon Dahlmann, Berlin
 2017 Berlin-Klondyke, Maribor Art Galleries, Maribor
 2016 Still still life, Galerie Bernd Kugler, Innsbruck
 2015 Joy, taidetehdas, Konstfabriken, Porvoo
 2013 Berlin-Klondyke, Werkschauhalle/Baumwollspinnerei, Leipzig
 2012 Alptraum, Metropolitan Museum of Manila, Manila
 2009 Transzendenz Inc., Hospitalhof, Stuttgart

References

Further reading
 Kellerloch Paintings, Q.H.S.O.I.Q.O.C.M.S., published by Dorothee Heine and Christian Malycha, Berlin 2013
 Art Spaces Directory, ed. by Eungie Joo and Ethan Swan, New Museum, New York 2012 
 Transzendenz Inc., ed. by Heike Kelter, René Luckhardt and Helmut A. Müller, Hospitalhof, Stuttgart 2010 
 Autocenter. Space for Contemporary Art, ed. by Joep van Liefland and Maik Schierloh, Distanz Verlag, Berlin 2014  
 HER (with Andreas L. Hofbauer), Der Konterfei 09, ed. by Robert Jelinek, Vienna 2015 
 ManufactorAy, text by Peter Weiermair, Galerie Bernd Kugler, Innsbruck 2015 (exhibition catalogue)
 Anamorphic Portraits, Galerie Bernd Kugler, Innsbruck 2017 (exhibition catalogue)
 5 is a different 1, text by Andreas L. Hofbauer, Galerie Bernd Kugler, Innsbruck 2018 (exhibition catalogue)
 Ossa carpi, manierlich, Salon Verlag, Cologne 2020

External links
 Artfacts.net information
 Wonderloch Kellerland homepage
 Galerie Bernd Kugler / Innsbruck (Austria)

1972 births
Living people
German conceptual artists
Contemporary painters
Artists from Berlin
Swiss artists